St. Treasas Convent Girls Higher Secondary School  is a public school situated in Kochi, India.

See also
List of schools in Ernakulam
Don Bosco
St Mary's school
Lisie medical lower primary school
Secret heart[thevara]

References

High schools and secondary schools in Kochi
Girls' schools in Kerala